Cognitive neuroscience is the scientific field that is concerned with the study of the biological processes and aspects that underlie cognition, with a specific focus on the neural connections in the brain which are involved in mental processes. It addresses the questions of how cognitive activities are affected or controlled by neural circuits in the brain. Cognitive neuroscience is a branch of both neuroscience and psychology, overlapping with disciplines such as behavioral neuroscience, cognitive psychology, physiological psychology and affective neuroscience. Cognitive neuroscience relies upon theories in cognitive science coupled with evidence from neurobiology, and computational modeling.

Parts of the brain play an important role in this field. Neurons play the most vital role, since the main point is to establish an understanding of cognition from a neural perspective, along with the different lobes of the cerebral cortex.

Methods employed in cognitive neuroscience include experimental procedures from psychophysics and cognitive psychology, functional neuroimaging, electrophysiology, cognitive genomics, and behavioral genetics.

Studies of patients with cognitive deficits due to brain lesions constitute an important aspect of cognitive neuroscience. The damages in lesioned brains provide a comparable starting point on regards to healthy and fully functioning brains. These damages change the neural circuits in the brain and cause it to malfunction during basic cognitive processes, such as memory or learning. People have learning disabilities and such damage, can be compared with how the healthy neural circuits are functioning, and possibly draw conclusions about the basis of the affected cognitive processes. Some examples of learning disabilities in the brain include places in Wernicke's area, the left side of the temporal lobe, and Brocca's area close to the frontal lobe.

Also, cognitive abilities based on brain development are studied and examined under the subfield of developmental cognitive neuroscience. This shows brain development over time, analyzing differences and concocting possible reasons for those differences.

Theoretical approaches include computational neuroscience and cognitive psychology.

Historical origins

Cognitive neuroscience is an interdisciplinary area of study that has emerged from neuroscience and psychology. There are several stages in these disciplines that have changed the way researchers approached their investigations and that led to the field becoming fully established.

Although the task of cognitive neuroscience is to describe the neural mechanisms associated with the mind, historically it has progressed by investigating how a certain area of the brain supports a given mental faculty. However, early efforts to subdivide the brain proved to be problematic. The phrenologist movement failed to supply a scientific basis for its theories and has since been rejected. The aggregate field view, meaning that all areas of the brain participated in all behavior, was also rejected as a result of brain mapping, which began with Hitzig and Fritsch's experiments and eventually developed through methods such as positron emission tomography (PET) and functional magnetic resonance imaging (fMRI). Gestalt theory, neuropsychology, and the cognitive revolution were major turning points in the creation of cognitive neuroscience as a field, bringing together ideas and techniques that enabled researchers to make more links between behavior and its neural substrates.

Origins in philosophy
Philosophers have always been interested in the mind: "the idea that explaining a phenomenon involves understanding the mechanism responsible for it has deep roots in the History of Philosophy from atomic theories in 5th century B.C. to its rebirth in the 17th and 18th century in the works of Galileo, Descartes, and Boyle. Among others, it's Descartes' idea that machines humans build could work as models of scientific explanation."
For example, Aristotle thought the brain was the body's cooling system and the capacity for intelligence was located in the heart. It has been suggested that the first person to believe otherwise was the Roman physician Galen in the second century AD, who declared that the brain was the source of mental activity, although this has also been accredited to Alcmaeon. However, Galen believed that personality and emotion were not generated by the brain, but rather by other organs. Andreas Vesalius, an anatomist and physician, was the first to believe that the brain and the nervous system are the center of the mind and emotion. Psychology, a major contributing field to cognitive neuroscience, emerged from philosophical reasoning about the mind.

19th century

Phrenology

One of the predecessors to cognitive neuroscience was phrenology, a pseudoscientific approach that claimed that behavior could be determined by the shape of the scalp. In the early 19th century, Franz Joseph Gall and J. G. Spurzheim believed that the human brain was localized into approximately 35 different sections. In his book, The Anatomy and Physiology of the Nervous System in General, and of the Brain in Particular, Gall claimed that a larger bump in one of these areas meant that that area of the brain was used more frequently by that person. This theory gained significant public attention, leading to the publication of phrenology journals and the creation of phrenometers, which measured the bumps on a human subject's head. While phrenology remained a fixture at fairs and carnivals, it did not enjoy wide acceptance within the scientific community. The major criticism of phrenology is that researchers were not able to test theories empirically.

Localizationist view
The localizationist view was concerned with mental abilities being localized to specific areas of the brain rather than on what the characteristics of the abilities were and how to measure them. Studies performed in Europe, such as those of John Hughlings Jackson, supported this view. Jackson studied patients with brain damage, particularly those with epilepsy. He discovered that the epileptic patients often made the same clonic and tonic movements of muscle during their seizures, leading Jackson to believe that they must be caused by activity in the same place in the brain every time. Jackson proposed that specific functions were localized to specific areas of the brain, which was critical to future understanding of the brain lobes.

Aggregate field view
According to the aggregate field view, all areas of the brain participate in every mental function.

Pierre Flourens, a French experimental psychologist, challenged the localizationist view by using animal experiments. He discovered that removing the cerebellum (brain) in rabbits and pigeons affected their sense of muscular coordination, and that all cognitive functions were disrupted in pigeons when the cerebral hemispheres were removed. From this he concluded that the cerebral cortex, cerebellum, and brainstem functioned together as a whole. His approach has been criticised on the basis that the tests were not sensitive enough to notice selective deficits had they been present.

Emergence of neuropsychology
Perhaps the first serious attempts to localize mental functions to specific locations in the brain was by Broca and Wernicke. This was mostly achieved by studying the effects of injuries to different parts of the brain on psychological functions. In 1861, French neurologist Paul Broca came across a man with a disability who was able to understand the language but unable to speak. The man could only produce the sound "tan". It was later discovered that the man had damage to an area of his left frontal lobe now known as Broca's area. Carl Wernicke, a German neurologist, found a patient who could speak fluently but non-sensibly. The patient had been the victim of a stroke, and could not understand spoken or written language. This patient had a lesion in the area where the left parietal and temporal lobes meet, now known as Wernicke's area. These cases, which suggested that lesions caused specific behavioral changes, strongly supported the localizationist view. Additionally, Aphasia is a learning disorder which was also discovered by Paul Broca. According to, Johns Hopkins School of Medicine, Aphasia is a language disorder caused by damage in a specific area of the brain that controls language expression and comprehension. This can often lead to the person speaking words with no sense known as "word salad"

Mapping the brain
In 1870, German physicians Eduard Hitzig and Gustav Fritsch published their findings of the behavior of animals. Hitzig and Fritsch ran an electric current through the cerebral cortex of a dog, causing different muscles to contract depending on which areas of the brain were electrically stimulated. This led to the proposition that individual functions are localized to specific areas of the brain rather than the cerebrum as a whole, as the aggregate field view suggests. Brodmann was also an important figure in brain mapping; his experiments based on Franz Nissl's tissue staining techniques divided the brain into fifty-two areas.

20th century

Cognitive revolution

At the start of the 20th century, attitudes in America were characterized by pragmatism, which led to a preference for behaviorism as the primary approach in psychology. J.B. Watson was a key figure with his stimulus-response approach. By conducting experiments on animals he was aiming to be able to predict and control behavior. Behaviorism eventually failed because it could not provide realistic psychology of human action and thought – it focused primarily on stimulus-response associations at the expense of explaining phenomena like thought and imagination. This led to what is often termed as the "cognitive revolution".

Neuron doctrine

In the early 20th century, Santiago Ramón y Cajal and Camillo Golgi began working on the structure of the neuron. Golgi developed a silver staining method that could entirely stain several cells in a particular area, leading him to believe that neurons were directly connected with each other in one cytoplasm. Cajal challenged this view after staining areas of the brain that had less myelin and discovering that neurons were discrete cells. Cajal also discovered that cells transmit electrical signals down the neuron in one direction only. Both Golgi and Cajal were awarded a Nobel Prize in Physiology or Medicine in 1906 for this work on the neuron doctrine.

Mid-late 20th century 
Several findings in the 20th century continued to advance the field, such as the discovery of ocular dominance columns, recording of single nerve cells in animals, and coordination of eye and head movements. Experimental psychology was also significant in the foundation of cognitive neuroscience. Some particularly important results were the demonstration that some tasks are accomplished via discrete processing stages, the study of attention, and the notion that behavioural data do not provide enough information by themselves to explain mental processes. As a result, some experimental psychologists began to investigate neural bases of behaviour. 
Wilder Penfield created maps of primary sensory and motor areas of the brain by stimulating the cortices of patients during surgery. The work of Sperry and Gazzaniga on split brain patients in the 1950s was also instrumental in the progress of the field. The term cognitive neuroscience itself was coined by Gazzaniga and cognitive psychologist George Armitage Miller while sharing a taxi in 1976.

Brain mapping 
New brain mapping technology, particularly fMRI and PET, allowed researchers to investigate experimental strategies of cognitive psychology by observing brain function. Although this is often thought of as a new method (most of the technology is relatively recent), the underlying principle goes back as far as 1878 when blood flow was first associated with brain function. Angelo Mosso, an Italian psychologist of the 19th century, had monitored the pulsations of the adult brain through neurosurgically created bony defects in the skulls of patients. He noted that when the subjects engaged in tasks such as mathematical calculations the pulsations of the brain increased locally. Such observations led Mosso to conclude that blood flow of the brain followed function.

Emergence of a new discipline

Birth of cognitive science
On September 11, 1956, a large-scale meeting of cognitivists took place at the Massachusetts Institute of Technology. George A. Miller presented his "The Magical Number Seven, Plus or Minus Two" paper while Noam Chomsky and Newell & Simon presented their findings on computer science. Ulric Neisser commented on many of the findings at this meeting in his 1967 book Cognitive Psychology. The term "psychology" had been waning in the 1950s and 1960s, causing the field to be referred to as "cognitive science". Behaviorists such as Miller began to focus on the representation of language rather than general behavior. David Marr concluded that one should understand any cognitive process at three levels of analysis. These levels include computational, algorithmic/representational, and physical levels of analysis.

Combining neuroscience and cognitive science
Before the 1980s, interaction between neuroscience and cognitive science was scarce. Cognitive neuroscience began to integrate the newly laid theoretical ground in cognitive science, that emerged between the 1950s and 1960s, with approaches in experimental psychology, neuropsychology and neuroscience. (Neuroscience was not established as a unified discipline until 1971). In the very late 20th century new technologies evolved that are now the mainstay of the methodology of cognitive neuroscience, including TMS (1985) and fMRI (1991). Earlier methods used in cognitive neuroscience include EEG (human EEG 1920) and MEG (1968). Occasionally cognitive neuroscientists utilize other brain imaging methods such as PET and SPECT. An upcoming technique in neuroscience is NIRS which uses light absorption to calculate changes in oxy- and deoxyhemoglobin in cortical areas. In some animals Single-unit recording can be used. Other methods include microneurography, facial EMG, and eye tracking. Integrative neuroscience attempts to consolidate data in databases, and form unified descriptive models from various fields and scales: biology, psychology, anatomy, and clinical practice.

Adaptive resonance theory (ART) is a cognitive neuroscience theory developed by Gail Carpenter and Stephen Grossberg in the late 1970s on aspects of how the brain processes information. It describes a number of neural network models which use supervised and unsupervised learning methods, and address problems such as pattern recognition and prediction.

In 2014, Stanislas Dehaene, Giacomo Rizzolatti and Trevor Robbins, were awarded the Brain Prize "for their pioneering research on higher brain mechanisms underpinning such complex human functions as literacy, numeracy, motivated behaviour and social cognition, and for their efforts to understand cognitive and behavioural disorders". Brenda Milner, Marcus Raichle and John O'Keefe received the Kavli Prize in Neuroscience "for the discovery of specialized brain networks for memory and cognition" and O'Keefe shared the Nobel Prize in Physiology or Medicine in the same year with May-Britt Moser and Edvard Moser "for their discoveries of cells that constitute a positioning system in the brain".

In 2017, Wolfram Schultz, Peter Dayan and Ray Dolan were awarded the Brain Prize "for their multidisciplinary analysis of brain mechanisms that link learning to reward, which has far-reaching implications for the understanding of human behaviour, including disorders of decision-making in conditions such as gambling, drug addiction, compulsive behaviour and schizophrenia".,

Recent trends
Recently the focus of research had expanded from the localization of brain area(s) for specific functions in the adult brain using a single technology. Studies have been diverging in several different directions: exploring the interactions between different brain areas, using multiple technologies and approaches to understand brain functions, and using computational approaches. Advances in non-invasive functional neuroimaging and associated data analysis methods have also made it possible to use highly naturalistic stimuli and tasks such as feature films depicting social interactions in cognitive neuroscience studies.

Another very recent trend in cognitive neuroscience is the use of optogenetics to explore circuit function and its behavioral consequences.

Topics
Attention
Consciousness
Decision-making
Emotions
Intelligence
Language
Learning
Memory
Perception
Social cognition

Methods
Experimental methods include:
Psychophysics
Eye-tracking
Functional magnetic resonance imaging
Electroencephalography
Magnetoencephalography
Electrocorticography
Transcranial Magnetic Stimulation
Computational Modeling

See also

Cognitive biology
Cognitive psychology
Embodied cognition
Experimental psychology
Cognitive psychophysiology
Affective neuroscience
Social neuroscience
Social cognitive neuroscience
Cultural neuroscience
List of cognitive neuroscientists
Neurochemistry
Neuroethology
Neuroendocrinology
Neuroscience

References

Further reading
 
 
 
 
Enersen, O. D. (2009). John Hughlings Jackson. In: Who Named It. http://www.whonamedit.com/doctor.cfm/2766.html Retrieved 14 August 2009
Gazzaniga, M. S., Ivry, R. B. & Mangun, G. R. (2002). Cognitive Neuroscience: The biology of the mind (2nd ed.). New York: W.W.Norton.
Gallistel, R. (2009). "Memory and the Computational Brain: Why Cognitive Science will Transform Neuroscience." Wiley-Blackwell .
Gazzaniga, M. S., The Cognitive Neurosciences III, (2004), The MIT Press, 
Gazzaniga, M. S., Ed. (1999). Conversations in the Cognitive Neurosciences, The MIT Press, .
Sternberg, Eliezer J. Are You a Machine? The Brain, the Mind and What it Means to be Human. Amherst, NY: Prometheus Books.

Handbook of Functional Neuroimaging of Cognition By Roberto Cabeza, Alan Kingstone
Principles of neural science By Eric R. Kandel, James H. Schwartz, Thomas M. Jessell
The Cognitive Neuroscience of Memory By Amanda Parker, Edward L. Wilding, Timothy J. Bussey
Neuronal Theories of the Brain By Christof Koch, Joel L. Davis
Cambridge Handbook of Thinking and Reasoning By Keith James Holyoak, Robert G. Morrison
Handbook of Mathematical Cognition By Jamie I. D. Campbell
Cognitive Psychology By Michael W. Eysenck, Mark T. Keane
Development of Intelligence By Mike Anderson
Development of Mental Processing By Andreas Demetriou, et al.
Memory and Thinking By Robert H. Logie, K. J. Gilhooly
Memory Capacity By Nelson Cowan
Proceedings of the Nineteenth Annual Conference of the Cognitive Science
Models of Working Memory By Akira Miyake, Priti Shah
Memory and Thinking By Robert H. Logie, K. J. Gilhooly
Variation in Working Memory By Andrew R. A. Conway, et al.
Memory Capacity By Nelson Cowan
Cognition and Intelligence By Robert J. Sternberg, Jean E. Pretz
General Factor of Intelligence By Robert J. Sternberg, Elena Grigorenko
Neurological Basis of Learning, Development and Discovery By Anton E. Lawson
Memory and Human Cognition By John T. E. Richardson
Society for Neuroscience. https://web.archive.org/web/20090805111859/http://www.sfn.org/index.cfm?pagename=about_SfN#timeline Retrieved 14 August 2009
Keiji Tanaka,"Current Opinion in Neurobiology", (2007)

External links

 Cognitive Neuroscience Society Homepage
 There's Something about Zero
 What Is Cognitive Neuroscience?, Jamie Ward/Psychology Press
 goCognitive - Educational Tools for Cognitive Neuroscience (including video interviews)
 CogNet, The Brain and Cognitive Sciences Community Online, MIT
 Cognitive Neuroscience Arena, Psychology Press
 Cognitive Neuroscience and Philosophy, CUJCS, Spring 2002
 Whole Brain Atlas Top 100 Brain Structures
 Cognitive Neuroscience Discussion Group
 John Jonides, a big role in Cognitive Neurosciences by Beebrite
 Introduction to Cognitive Neuroscience
 AgliotiLAB - Social and Cognitive Neuroscience Laboratory founded in 2003 in Rome, Italy

Related Wikibooks
 Wikibook on cognitive psychology and cognitive neuroscience
 Wikibook on consciousness studies
 Cognitive Neuroscience chapter of the Wikibook on neuroscience
 Computational Cognitive Neuroscience wikibook